Henry Thompson was a United States Navy sailor and a recipient of the United States military's highest decoration, the Medal of Honor.

Thompson joined the Navy and by June 27, 1878, was serving at the rank of seaman. At Mare Island, California, that day, he rescued a man from drowning, for which he was awarded the Medal of Honor.

Thompson's official Medal of Honor citation reads:
For rescuing a man from drowning at Mare Island, Calif., 27 June 1878.

See also

List of Medal of Honor recipients during peacetime

References

External links

Year of birth missing
Year of death missing
United States Navy sailors
United States Navy Medal of Honor recipients
Non-combat recipients of the Medal of Honor